Brinsley Schwarz is the eponymous debut album by pub rock band Brinsley Schwarz, released in April 1970.

Recorded shortly after the band had changed its name from Kippington Lodge, the album was released just after the ill-fated "Brinsley Schwarz Hype". It has been described as a "naïve blend of Crosby, Stills & Nash, Dylan & the Band, and Buffalo Springfield, with a heavy dose of early Yes" (Stephen Thomas Erlewine).

The cover was designed by Barney Bubbles for his short-lived graphic art company "Teenburger Designs". The original vinyl album (Capitol 11869) was re-issued on CD in 1996 (Repertoire 0004421).

Track listing
All songs are written by Nick Lowe except where specified 
 "Hymn to Me" (Lowe, Rankin, Schwarz, Andrews) - 4:50
 "Shining Brightly" – 4:20
 "Rock and Roll Women" – 3:19
 "Lady Constant" – 7:23
 "What Do You Suggest?" – 4:47
 "Mayfly" – 4:37
 "Ballad of a Has Been Beauty Queen" – 10:26

Personnel
Brinsley Schwarz
 Brinsley Schwarz - guitar, percussion, vocals
 Billy Rankin - drums, percussion
 Bob Andrews - keyboards, bass, vocals
 Nick Lowe - bass, acoustic guitar, slide guitar, vocals
Technical
Bob Hall - engineer
Teenburger Designs - cover design, typography

References

Brinsley Schwarz albums
1970 debut albums
United Artists Records albums
Capitol Records albums
Albums produced by Brinsley Schwarz (musician)
Albums produced by Nick Lowe
Albums produced by Billy Rankin (drummer)
Albums produced by Bob Andrews (keyboardist)
albums recorded at Olympic Sound Studios